Kumarankudi is a village in the Kumbakonam taluk of Thanjavur district, Tamil Nadu, India.

Demographics 

As per the 2001 census, Kumarankudi had a total population of 2091 with 1044 males and 1047 females. The sex ratio was 1003. The literacy rate was 54.43

References 

 

Villages in Thanjavur district